Cristian Manuel Insaurralde (born 20 July 1991) is an Argentine professional footballer who currently plays for Estudiantes RC.

Honours

Club
América
Liga MX: Apertura 2018

References

External links 
 Profile at BDFA 
 
 

1991 births
Living people
Argentine footballers
Argentine expatriate footballers
Association football forwards
Sportivo Belgrano footballers
Club Atlético River Plate footballers
Quilmes Atlético Club footballers
O'Higgins F.C. footballers
Cerro Porteño players
Club América footballers
Newell's Old Boys footballers
Unión de Santa Fe footballers
Estudiantes de Río Cuarto footballers
Liga MX players
Chilean Primera División players
Argentine Primera División players
Primera Nacional players
Paraguayan Primera División players
Argentine expatriate sportspeople in Chile
Argentine expatriate sportspeople in Mexico
Argentine expatriate sportspeople in Paraguay
Expatriate footballers in Chile
Expatriate footballers in Mexico
Expatriate footballers in Paraguay
People from Resistencia, Chaco
Sportspeople from Chaco Province